Lars Jönsson (born 4 September 1961) is a Swedish film producer connected to Memfis Film and the "Trollywood" facilities. Since the early 1990s he has been the producer of several films in Sweden and Scandinavia, being the usual producer for among others Lukas Moodysson, Josef Fares and Maria Blom, while also having co-produced many films by Lars von Trier.

Filmography 
 Antichrist (2009) (co-producer)
 Mammoth (2009) (producer)
 Fishy (2008) (producer)
 Leo (2007) (executive producer)
 Nina Frisk (2007) (producer)
 Island of Lost Souls (De fortabte sjæles ø) (2007) (executive producer)
 Falkenberg Farewell (Farväl Falkenberg) (2006) (executive producer)
 Container (2006) (executive producer) (producer)
 Zozo (2005) (executive producer)
 Manderlay (2005) (co-producer)
 Next Door (Naboer) (2005) (co-executive producer)
 Krama mig (2005) (producer)
 Dalecarlians (Masjävlar) (2004) (producer)
 A Hole in My Heart (Ett hål i mitt hjärta) (2004) (producer)
 Fragile (2004) (executive producer)
 Dogville (2003) (co-executive producer)
 Skagerrak (2003) (executive producer)
 Kopps (2003) (executive producer)
 It's All About Love (2003) (co-producer)
 Bear's Kiss (2002) (co-producer)
 Lilya 4-ever (Lilja 4-ever) (2002) (producer)
 Catch That Girl (Klatretøsen) (2002) (co-producer)
 Chop Chop (Fukssvansen) (2001) (co-producer)
 The Best Man's Wedding (Jalla! Jalla!) (2000) (executive producer)
 Prop and Berta (Prop og Berta) (2000) (co-producer)
 Together (Tillsammans) (2000) (producer)
 Dancer in the Dark (2000) (co-executive producer)
 Hundhotellet (2000) (producer)
 A Summer Tale (Den Bästa sommaren) (2000) (producer)
 Love Fools (Hela härligheten) (1998) (producer)
 Show Me Love (Fucking Åmål) (1998) (producer)
 Lucky People Center International (1998) (producer)
 H.C. Andersen's The Long Shadow (H.C. Andersen og den skæve skygge) (1998) (co-producer)
 Tranceformer - A Portrait of Lars von Trier (1997) (producer)
 Tiger Heart (Tigerhjärta) (1997) (producer)
 The Last Viking (Den Sidste viking) (1997) (executive producer)
 Talk (Bara prata lite) (1997) (producer)
 Breaking the Waves (1996) (executive producer)
 Harry och Sonja (1996) (producer)
 Dreamplay (Drømspel) (1994) (producer)
 House of Angels'' (Änglagård) (1992) (executive producer)

References

External links
 
 

Swedish film producers
1961 births
Living people
Producers who won the Best Film Guldbagge Award